Telida Airport  is a public use airport located in Telida, in the Yukon-Koyukuk Census Area of the U.S. state of Alaska.

The National Plan of Integrated Airport Systems for 2011–2015 categorized it as a general aviation facility.

Facilities 
Telida Airport resides at elevation of 650 feet (198 m) above mean sea level. It has one runway designated 2/20 with a turf and dirt surface measuring 1,900 by 40 feet (579 x 12 m).

References

External links 
 FAA Alaska airport diagram (GIF)
 Topographic map from USGS The National Map

Airports in the Yukon–Koyukuk Census Area, Alaska